Lisa McHugh (born 16 August 1988) is a Scottish pop and country singer. She was born in Glasgow, Scotland, to Irish parents. Her father is from Castlederg in County Tyrone and her mother is from Falcarragh in Cloughaneely, a district in the north-west of County Donegal. In June 2010 she moved to Ireland, put together her band and toured. She has won "Female Vocalist of the Year" five times as well as "Outstanding Achievement on the World Stage" in 2012 when she appeared on the Grand Ole Opry. She also ran her own television show titled On the Road with Lisa.

Discography

Studio albums

Live albums

Other singles and guest appearances
 "I Told You So" (2010) (duet with Robert Mizzell, on his album Redneck Man)
 "A Mother's Rosary" (2011)
 "I'll Be Home With Bells On" (2011) (duet with Daniel O'Donnell)
 "Let's Pretend We Never Met" (2013)
 "Y'all Come" (2018)
 "Honey, Honey" (2018) (duet with Derek Ryan)
 "Country Mile" (2019)
 "Watch Me" (2019)
 "Home with a Heartbeat" (2019)
 "The Scandal" (2020)
 "You're Gonna Get Back Up" (2020)
 "Bad Idea" (2021)

References

External links
 Official website

Living people
Musicians from Glasgow
Irish country singers
British country singers
Irish people of Scottish descent
1988 births
21st-century British singers
21st-century Irish women singers
21st-century Irish singers